Stan Andrews (April 17, 1917 in Lynn, Massachusetts – June 10, 1995 in Bradenton, Florida) was an American baseball catcher who played from 1939 to 1945 for the Boston Bees, Brooklyn Dodgers and Philadelphia Phillies.

External links

1917 births
1995 deaths
Baseball players from Massachusetts
Birmingham Barons players
Boston Bees players
Brooklyn Dodgers players
Fort Lauderdale Braves players
Hartford Bees players
Hartford Laurels players
Hollywood Stars players
Major League Baseball catchers
Montreal Royals players
Sportspeople from Lynn, Massachusetts
Philadelphia Phillies players
St. Paul Saints (AA) players
St. Petersburg Saints players
West Palm Beach Indians players
Zanesville Greys players